Siegfried Bosch is a German mathematician working in arithmetic geometry, focusing in particular on nonarchimedean analytic geometry.

He completed his Ph.D. in 1967 at the University of Göttingen with a dissertation entitled Endliche analytische Homomorphismen (Finite analytic homomorphisms), and received his habilitation degree in 1972.  Since 1974 he has been a professor at the University of Münster.

Bosch is the author of several books in algebra and geometry.

Books

References

External links 
 Homepage
 

Living people
20th-century German mathematicians
21st-century German mathematicians
University of Göttingen alumni
Academic staff of the University of Münster
Year of birth missing (living people)